Ed Peirce (c. 1872 – December 24, 1947) was an American politician in the state of Washington. He served in the Washington State Senate from 1933 to 1937. From 1935 to 1937, he was President pro tempore of the Senate.

References

Democratic Party Washington (state) state senators
1947 deaths
Place of birth missing